Robin Douglas Tait (14 April 1940 in Dunedin, Otago – 20 March 1984 in Auckland) was a discus thrower, who represented New Zealand at two Summer Olympics: 1968 and 1972.

He represented New Zealand at six Commonwealth Games: 1962, 1966, 1970, 1974, 1978 and  1982.

He won the gold medal at the 1974 British Commonwealth Games in the men's discus throw event, and the bronze in the same event in 1966. Tait carried the New Zealand flag at the opening ceremony of the 1982 Commonwealth Games in Brisbane, Queensland, Australia.

External links
 
 Profile at New Zealand Commonwealth Games website

1940 births
1984 deaths
New Zealand male discus throwers
Athletes (track and field) at the 1968 Summer Olympics
Athletes (track and field) at the 1972 Summer Olympics
Olympic athletes of New Zealand
Athletes from Dunedin
Commonwealth Games gold medallists for New Zealand
Commonwealth Games bronze medallists for New Zealand
Athletes (track and field) at the 1962 British Empire and Commonwealth Games
Athletes (track and field) at the 1966 British Empire and Commonwealth Games
Athletes (track and field) at the 1970 British Commonwealth Games
Athletes (track and field) at the 1974 British Commonwealth Games
Athletes (track and field) at the 1978 Commonwealth Games
Athletes (track and field) at the 1982 Commonwealth Games
Commonwealth Games medallists in athletics
Medallists at the 1966 British Empire and Commonwealth Games
Medallists at the 1974 British Commonwealth Games